Love in a Mist or Love in a mist may refer to:

 Nigella damascena, a plant commonly known as Love in a mist
 Love in a Mist (album), a 1967 album by Marianne Faithful
 Love in a Mist (play), a 1941 comedy play by Kenneth Horne